Shahrak-e Shahid Beheshti (also Romanized as Shahrak-e Shahīd Beheshtī) is a village in Dust Mohammad Rural District, in the Central District of Hirmand County, Sistan and Baluchestan Province, Iran. At the 2006 census, its population was 785, in 154 families.

References 

Populated places in Hirmand County